Jan Jan (also Romanized as Jān Jān and Jānjān) is a village in Hasanabad Rural District, in the Central District of Ravansar County, Kermanshah Province, Iran. At the 2006 census, its population was 101, living in 23 families.

References 

Populated places in Ravansar County